Brlić is a Croatian surname. Notable people with the surname include:

 Andrija Torkvat Brlić (1826–1868), Croatian writer, linguist, politician, and lawyer
 Ivana Brlić-Mažuranić (1874–1938), Croatian children's writer

Croatian surnames